The Emerald Coast Barracudas were a women's American football team in the Women's Football Alliance.  Previously a member of the National Women's Football Association and known as the Panama City Beach Rumble and the Emerald Coast Sharks, they were based in Panama City, Florida (along Florida's Emerald Coast).  They played their home games at Pete Edwards Field.

Season-By-Season 

|-
| colspan="6" align="center" | Panama City Beach Rumble (NWFA)
|-
|2002 || 1 || 7 || 0 || 4th South || --
|-
|2003 || 4 || 4 || 0 || 3rd Southern || --
|-
|2004 || colspan="6" rowspan="1" align="center" | Did Not Play 
|-
| colspan="6" align="center" | Emerald Coast Sharks (NWFA)
|-
|2005 || 0 || 8 || 0 || 14th Southern || --
|-
| colspan="6" align="center" | Emerald Coast Barracudas (NWFA)
|-
|2006 || 1 || 7 || 0 || 4th Southern Southeast || --
|-
|2007 || 0 || 8 || 0 || 4th Southern South || --
|-
|2008 || 0 || 8 || 0 || 4th Southern Southeast || --
|-
| colspan="6" align="center" | Emerald Coast Barracudas (WFA)
|-
|2009 || 0 || 8 || 0 || 5th American Southeast || --
|-
!Totals || 6 || 50 || 0
|colspan="2"|

2009 Season Schedule

References

Emerald Coast Barracudas

Women's Football Alliance teams
Panama City, Florida
American football teams in Florida
American football teams established in 2002
American football teams disestablished in 2010
2002 establishments in Florida
2010 disestablishments in Florida